Jean Louise Geissinger (later Harding; June 25, 1934 – June 8, 2014) was an infielder and outfielder who played from  through  in the All-American Girls Professional Baseball League with the Fort Wayne Daisies (1951-1952 [start], 1953–1954) and the Grand Rapids Chicks (1952 [end]).

Career 
″Dutch″, as she was dubbed by teammates, was born in Huntingdon, Pennsylvania to Richard and Lillian (Fagan) Geissinger. She was a versatile ballplayer, playing at second base and in all three outfield positions. She mainly played at center field and served also as an emergency relief pitcher. She has been considered as one of the top sluggers in AAGPBL history.

Geissinger led the AAGPBL hitters in runs batted in in 1953 (81) and 1954 (91), while finishing second for the batting crown with a .337 average in 1954. Besides, she was selected for the All-Star Team in both 1953 and 1954. In the 1953 contest, she finished it in style hitting a walk-off home run.

Though Geissinger played only four seasons, her .306 average ranks her third in the AAGPBL all-time list, being surpassed only by the sisters Joanne Weaver (.359) and Betty Weaver Foss (.342), while her 41 homers ranks her fourth behind  Eleanor Callow (55), Wilma Briggs (43) and Dorothy Schroeder (42).

When the league was unable to continue in 1955, Geissinger joined several other players selected by former Daisies manager Bill Allington to play in the national touring team known as the All-Americans All-Stars. The team played 100 games, each booked in a different town, against male teams, while traveling over 10,000 miles in the manager's station wagon and a Ford Country Sedan. Besides Geissinger, the Allington All-Stars included players as Joan Berger, Gloria Cordes, Jeanie Descombes, Gertrude Dunn, Betty Foss, Mary Froning, Katie Horstman, Maxine Kline, Dolores Lee, Magdalen Redman, Ruth Richard, Dorothy Schroeder, Jean Smith, Dolly Vanderlip and Joanne Weaver, among others.

Family 
While playing baseball, Geissinger met Russell Harding. They were married in 1959 and had three daughters, Ann, Karla and Jana. Following her baseball career, she worked at the Branch Intermediate School District of Coldwater, Michigan with special needs children. In addition, she joined a fast-pitch softball team, where she was known as "Dutch", and eventually stayed involved by coaching or umpiring games.

Death and legacy 

Jean Geissinger-Harding died in 2014 in Kalamazoo, Michigan, 17 days before her 80th birthday.

AAGPBL batting statistics

References
 All-American Girls Professional Baseball League Record Book – W. C. Madden. Publisher: McFarland & Company. Format: Paperback, 294pp. Language: English.

External links
 Jean Harding (Geissinger) – Profile / Obituary All-American Girls Professional Baseball League. Retrieved 2019-04-08.
Obituary

1934 births
2014 deaths
All-American Girls Professional Baseball League players
Fort Wayne Daisies players
Grand Rapids Chicks players
Baseball players from Pennsylvania
People from Coldwater, Michigan
People from Huntingdon, Pennsylvania
21st-century American women